Pray for Rain may refer to:

Pray for Rain (band), San Francisco-based band and film score composers
PFR, Nashville Christian rock band
Pray for Rain, 1992 album by PFR
Pray for Rain, 1996 album by Tim Feehan
Pray for Rain, 2015 album by Pure Bathing Culture
"Pray for Rain", song from Bad English album Backlash
"Pray for Rain", song from Massive Attack album Heligoland
Pray for Rain (film), 2017 film
 "Pray for Rain", 1948 poem about Warren Spahn and Johnny Sain.